Events from the year 1856 in Sweden

Incumbents
 Monarch – Oscar I

Events
 7 May - The Swedish Evangelical Mission is established.,
 29 September - Fredrika Bremer publishes her famous novel Hertha, which contributes to a great debate about reform within women's rights. 
 15 October – André Oscar Wallenberg establishes the Stockholms Enskilda Bank.
Date unknown – Luleå becomes the seat of Norrbotten County.
Date unknown - Construction of the Western Main Line, the main railway line between Stockholm and Gothenburg, begins.
Date unknown - Revision of the Infanticide Act (Sweden).
Date unknown - Inauguration of the theater Folkan in Stockholm.

Births
 8 March - Cecilia Milow, author, translator, educator, campaigner and suffragette (died 1946)
 29 June - Maria Cederschiöld, journalist  (died 1935)
 3 September - Selma Ek, operatic soprano (died 1941) 
 10 December - Karolina Widerström, first female physician  (died 1949)
 Anna Sterky, union worker  (died 1939)
 Augusta Andersson, restaurant owner (died 1938)

Deaths

 - Elisabeth Charlotta Karsten, painter   (born 1789)
 - Charlotta Öberg, poet  (born 1818)

References

External links

 
Years of the 19th century in Sweden
Sweden